Viktor Bulat (born 1 April 1971) is a Belarusian athlete. He competed in the men's shot put at the 1996 Summer Olympics.

References

1971 births
Living people
Athletes (track and field) at the 1996 Summer Olympics
Belarusian male shot putters
Olympic athletes of Belarus
Place of birth missing (living people)
Universiade silver medalists for Belarus
Universiade medalists in athletics (track and field)
Medalists at the 1995 Summer Universiade